Jack Ralite (14 May 1928 – 12 November 2017) was a French politician. He was elected in 1973 to the Seine-Saint-Denis constituency for the French Communist Party. In 1981 he became Minister for Health and subsequently Minister for Employment (1981–1984). 

While serving as Minister for Health, he implemented a new health care policy that included the abolition of private beds in hospitals, reform of medical training, modernisation of facilities, and the election of the heads of medical services by the entire staff, rather than just by doctors, as had previously been the case.

In 1984 he became Mayor of Aubervilliers, a post he retained until 2003.

References

1928 births
2017 deaths
Politicians of the French Fifth Republic
French Senators of the Fifth Republic
French Ministers of Health
French Communist Party politicians
Mayors of places in Île-de-France
People from Aubervilliers
Senators of Seine-Saint-Denis
Légion d'honneur refusals